Herson is a surname. Notable people with the surname include:

Leslie Herson (1942–2008), American businesswoman and artist
Michael H. Herson, American lobbyist

See also
Henson (name)
Merson

English-language surnames
Jewish surnames